K-System is a side project by Finnish DJ and producer, Kimmo Kauppinen. K-System was started in 1999.

Music
The first single released by K-System was released in July 1999, and was called "Come to Me". The song was an immediate success, and stayed on the Finnish Dance Charts for eight weeks.

External links
K-System's Official Website

Finnish electronic musicians